Aggregatibacter aphrophilus is a species of bacteria. It is one of the HACEK organisms.

References

Pasteurellales